This is a list of waterways in Navarre, Florida, including all bodies of water within the Navarre, Navarre Beach, and Holley Census Designated Places.

By basin

East Bay
Chimney Cove
Doghole Basin
Catfish Basin
Catfish Branch
East Lagoon
East Bay River
Arachno Creek
Alligator Creek
Panther Creek
Parker Lake via an unnamed creek
Dean Creek
West Head
Watering Head
Steep Head
East Head
Gable Lake via an unnamed stream
Hidden Pond via an unnamed stream
Hidden Creek
Poplar Creek
Fundy Bayou
Miller Bayou
Tom King Bayou
Yellow River
Boiling Creek
Fishtrap Branch
Holley Creek
Indigo Creek
Little Boiling Creek
Poplar Branch
Atwell Pond
Weaver River
Weaver Creek
Boggy Branch
Double Head Branch
Buck Pond
Hicks Creek

Gulf of Mexico

Santa Rosa Sound
William's Creek
Several unnamed creeks
Several unnamed creeks on mainland
Several unnamed canals on Santa Rosa Island

Unconnected to larger bodies
Orion Lake
Prairie Ponds
Various unnamed ponds

References

See also
Navarre, Florida

Navarre, Florida
Bodies of water of Santa Rosa County, Florida
Tom King Bayou
Florida geography-related lists